United Hospital Limited is a private hospital in Gulshan Thana, Dhaka, Bangladesh.  Mohammad Faizur Rahman is the Managing Director and CEO of the hospital. United Hospital Limited along with Evercare Hospital Dhaka and Square Hospital are considered high end private hospitals.

History
United Hospital Limited was originally called Continental Hospital and was established in the mid 1980s. In 2004, Continental Hospital was purchased by a group of investors, led by United Group and later renamed to United Hospital Limited. It started its journey in August 2006.

On 11 January 2018, United Hospital was sued for dodging 210 million taka in taxes by the Anti-Corruption Commission. On 21 March 2018, United Hospital was fined for having expired medicine and reagents by a mobile court. Former Prime Minister, Khaleda Zia, who is imprisoned, has filed petition with the Bangladesh Sumpreme Court seeking treatment at United Hospital on 9 September 2018.
The first ever endoscopic laser assisted surgery in Bangladesh was performed at United Hospital Limited on 8 November 2015. Radical Cystoprostatectomy with Orthotopic Neobladder Reconstruction Surgery was performed by Dr M A Zulkifl at United Hospital Limited on a 60 year old patient. Dr Ashim Kumar Sen Gupta successfully conducted the first chronomodulated chemotherapy on an elder patient with advanced colon cancer. United Hospital Limited successfully carried out the first Transcatheter Valve Implant operation of implanting the aortic valve of a patient on July 25.

References 

Hospitals in Dhaka
2004 establishments in Bangladesh
Private hospitals in Bangladesh